Jairo do Nascimento (23 October 1946 – 6 February 2019) was a Brazilian footballer who played as a goalkeeper.

Career
Born in Joinville, Jairo was nicknamed "Pantera Negra" ("the Black Panther").

Jairo played for Caxias, Fluminense, Coritiba, Corinthians, Náutico Capibaribe, América Mineiro and Atlético Três Corações. For Coritiba he made 410 appearances in all competitions, winning the Campeonato Paranaense six times, as well as the Torneio do Povo in 1973 and the Campeonato Brasileiro Série A in 1985. At Corinthians he played in 190 appearances in all competitors and he did not concede a goal for a record 1,132 minutes of play. He also won the Campeonato Paulista in 1977 with the club.

He made one international appearance for Brazil, in 1976.

Later life and death
He died in Curitiba on 6 February 2019, aged 72, from kidney cancer.

References

1946 births
2019 deaths
Brazilian footballers
Brazil international footballers
Caxias Futebol Clube players
Fluminense FC players
Coritiba Foot Ball Club players
Sport Club Corinthians Paulista players
Clube Náutico Capibaribe players
América Futebol Clube (MG) players
Association football goalkeepers